The Huron Harbor Light is a lighthouse in Huron, Ohio on Lake Erie, on the west pier of the Huron Harbor.

References

Lighthouses in Ohio
Lighthouses completed in 1939
Buildings and structures in Erie County, Ohio
Harbor Light